Year 1327 (MCCCXXVII) was a common year starting on Thursday (link will display the full calendar) of the Julian calendar.

Events 
 January–December 
 January 25 – The 14-year-old Edward III is proclaimed King of England, after his mother Isabella has engineered the abdication of his imprisoned father Edward II of England, on January 20, effective January 25. Isabella and her lover Roger Mortimer rule as regents (the coronation takes place February 1).
 April 6 (Good Friday) – Tuscan writer Petrarch sees a woman he names Laura in the church of Sainte-Claire d'Avignon, which awakes in him a lasting passion. He writes a series of sonnets and other poems in Italian dedicated to her, which are collected into Il Canzoniere, an influential model for Renaissance culture.  
 June 14 – A peace treaty is signed between Norway and Sønderjylland.
 June 21 – Ingeborg of Norway marries her lover Knud Porse, but is deposed from political power in Norway.
 November – Alfonso IV of Aragon begins his reign.

 Date unknown 
 English abbot Richard of Wallingford describes the construction of an astronomical clock in his Tractatus Horologii Astronomici.
 Grand Canal (China), which ran from Hangzhou to Beijing over a distance of 1800 km, was completed.

Births 
 June – Malatesta Ungaro, Italian condottiero (d. 1372)
 October 30 – Andrew, Duke of Calabria (d. 1345)
 date unknown
 Charles de La Cerda, Franco-Spanish soldier (d. 1354)
 Elizabeth le Despenser, Baroness Berkeley, English noble (d. 1389)
 Demetrius I Starshy, Prince of Trubczewsk (d. 1399)
 Birger Gregersson, Archbishop of Uppsala (d. 1383)
 Baldus de Ubaldis, Italian jurist (d. 1400)
 probable – William Douglas, 1st Earl of Douglas, Scottish nobleman (d. 1384)

Deaths 
 January 16 – Nikephoros Choumnos, Byzantine scholar and statesman (b. 1250 or 1255)
 January 29 – Adolf, Count Palatine of the Rhine (b. 1300)
 March 15 – Albert of Schwarzburg, German grand preceptor of the Knights Hospitaller
 April 9 – Walter Stewart, 6th High Steward of Scotland (b. 1293)
 May 28 – Robert Baldock, Lord Privy Seal and Lord Chancellor of England
 May 29 – Jens Grand, Danish archbishop (b. c. 1260)
 July 4 – Stefano Visconti, Milanese nobleman
 August 25 – Demasq Kaja, Ilkhanate member of the Chobanid Family
 September 1 – Foulques de Villaret, French Grand Master of the Knights Hospitaller
 September 21 – King Edward II of England (murdered; b. 1284)
 September 26 – Cecco d'Ascoli, Italian encyclopaedist, physician and poet (b. 1257)
 October 20 – Teresa d'Entença, Countess of Urgell (b. 1300)
 October 27 – Elizabeth de Burgh, queen of Robert the Bruce
 November – Chupan, Chobanid prince of the Ilkhanate
 November 2 or November 5 – King James II of Aragon (b. 1267)
 December 19 – Agnes of France, Duchess of Burgundy
 date unknown
 Thomas Cobham, Bishop of Worcester
 Constantine I of Imereti
 David of Hrodna, Lithuanian military leader
 Vital du Four, French theologian (b. 1260)
 Walter Reynolds, Archbishop of Canterbury
 Sir Richard de Exeter, Anglo-Irish knight
 probable – Bartholomew of Lucca, Italian historian

In literature
 The action of Umberto Eco's novel The Name of the Rose (Il Nome della Rosa, 1980) takes place during this year.

References